The Prussian G 5.2 was a class of two-cylinder compound goods locomotive introduced in 1895. As with many Prussian locomotive design, simple and compound versions of the same type were built – in this case the G 5.2 was the two-cylinder compound version of the simple G 5.1. The compound locomotives were more economical and more powerful than the simple locomotives; they were more suitable for long stretches with few stops. The newly introduced air brakes made it possible to use the G 5.2 on passenger trains, which the Prussian State Railways often did.

Production started in 1895 and continued until 1901, with 491 locomotives built for Prussia. The Reichseisenbahnen in Elsaß-Lothringen (Imperial Railways in Alsace-Lorraine) acquired 215 similar locomotives between 1900 and 1908 as their C29, C31 and C32 classes (see Alsace-Lorraine G 5.2).

In 1923 the Deutsche Reichsbahn (DRG) included 317 locomotives in its steam locomotive renumbering plan as 54 201 to 54 517. However, 13 locomotives remained in foreign hands. In 1925 the remaining locomotives were renumbered 54 201 to 54 386. Of these, 23 (54 324, 54 343, 54 344, 54 353 and 54 368 to 54 386 were from the Reichseisenbahnen in Elsaß-Lothringen. The DRG retired its G 5.2 locomotives by the end of 1931.

After World War I, 18 Prussian G5.2 locomotives were left in Alsace-Lorraine, and five in Yugoslavia. After the Treaty of Versailles, 86 locomotives had to be surrendered as reparations: 39 to France (where they became Chemin de fer de Paris à Orléans 1963–2001), 36 to Belgium (Type 75), six to Italy (FS 603), and five to Czechoslovakia (ČSD 335). A further 74 locomotives were ceded to Poland where that became PKP class Ti2, and numbered Ti2-1 to Ti2-74; five to Latvia (LVD Pn) and five to Lithuania. Six more went to the Territory of the Saar Basin as Saar 4101–4106).

During World War II, 27 former PKP Ti2 locomotives were reclaimed by Germany from the Russians and 23 were renumbered 54 701 to 54 723 in the Reichsbahn's fleet. Included in this group were 12 former Alsace-Lorraine locomotives, which became 54 704, 54 708 to 54 717 and 54 723. After the end of the war, eight locomotives remained with PKP, who retired the last by 1954.

The locomotives were coupled to tenders of type pr 3 T 12.

Notes

References

Further reading

2-6-0 locomotives
G 05.2
Railway locomotives introduced in 1895
Standard gauge locomotives of Germany
1′C n2v locomotives
Freight locomotives
Berliner locomotives
Borsig locomotives
Hanomag locomotives
Schichau-Werke locomotives
SACM locomotives
Henschel locomotives